Piz Cacciabella (2,980 m) is a mountain in the Bregaglia Range of the Alps, overlooking Vicosoprano in the canton of Graubünden. It is the northernmost summit of the range between the valleys of Bondasca and Albigna.

References

External links
 Piz Cacciabella on Hikr

Mountains of the Alps
Mountains of Switzerland
Mountains of Graubünden
Two-thousanders of Switzerland
Bregaglia